The Yamaha 125 V4, also known as the RA31A, is a racing motorcycle produced by Yamaha, for the 125cc class of Grand Prix motorcycle racing, between 1966 and 1970.

RA31A
Already previewed in the competitions of the second half of 1966, in 1967 the last of the "RA" series was officially launched, the RA31, with a four-cylinder V engine with two crankshafts, connected to each other by means of a gear. where the cylinders are liquid-cooled and with a useful arc of use of the engine ranging from 15,000 to 17,000 rpm.

This bike is inspired by the Yamaha RD05 250 class model. It is characterized by the absence of silencers, in fact, there are still no rules on photometry in force, moreover, it adopts a mixed lubrication, oil-petrol mixture plus oil pump.

It will be with this model, used in the 1967 and 1968 world championships, that Yamaha will get its first world titles in the 125 class, the first year with Bill Ivy and the second (with the 31A version) with Phil Read.

References

125 V4
Grand Prix motorcycles